The 1978 Qom protest was a demonstration against the Pahlavi dynasty ignited by the Iran and Red and Black Colonization article published on 7 January 1978 in Ettela'at newspaper, one of the two publications with the largest circulation in Iran. The article insulted Khomeini, who later founded the Islamic Republic of Iran, describing him as Indian Sayyed.

The developments initiated by seminaries closing on 7 January 1978 followed by the bazaar and seminary closing, and students rallying towards the homes of the religious leaders on the next day. On 9 January 1978, seminary students and other people demonstrated in the city, which was cracked down on by the Shah's security forces shooting live ammunition to disperse the crowd when the peaceful demonstration turned violent. Between 5 and 300 of the demonstrators were reportedly killed in the protest. 9 January 1978 (19 Dey) is regarded as a bloody day in Qom.

Prelude

The January 1978 Qom protest was preceded by the June 1975 Qom protest staged by the seminary students and it violently suppressed by the security forces. On 7 January 1978, an article insulting Khomeini was published by a pseudonymous author in Ettela'at, an afternoon newspaper in Tehran. The article was sent by Daryiush Homayoon, the spokesperson for the ministry of Information at the time, for publication. He said that the article was sent to him by the ministry of the court under the Shah's order and that he was not aware of the article's content. According to David Menashri "the religious leaders equated personal attack on Khomeini with an attack on Islam as such. Moreover, being familiar with the regime's methods of manipulating the press, they concluded that the article had been fed to Ettela'at by the authorities. The religious leadership, therefore, regarded the publication of the article as heralding a campaign against them by the government." Speaking in a press interview, Ayatollah Shariatmadari said that the article had "besmirched our faith" and "shocked all Muslims in Iran."

Reacting to the article Ettela'at, huge protests were formed in Qom.

The events timeline

7 January 
Even though the newspaper had not yet reached Qom, news of the insulting article had spread across the city. Therefore, on Saturday evening, 7 January 1978, when the truck carrying newspapers approached the city of Qom, a large number of people immediately attacked it and set fire to the newspapers. A report by SAVAK described the event as such: "In tonight's demonstration, they tore up about 100 Ettela'at newspapers to show their protest. In addition, as a protest against the insult that was given to Khomeini in the Ettela'at newspaper, all the seminaries were closed."

On the evening of 7 January 1978, students of seminary in Qom made copies of the article, a cheap and safe method, adding the addendum that the next day a meeting was to be held at the Khan seminary in protest to the contents of the article. The same night, during phone conversations and private talks with seminary professors, academics, and students, it was decided to close the seminary and classrooms.

8 January 
On 8 January, seminaries and some shops were closed. Students who had halted classes gathered outside the Khan School (Ayatollah Boroujerdi School) and marched to the house of religious leaders, chanting slogans in favor of Imam Khomeini along the way. The crowd chanted "Death to this Yazidi regime," "Peace be upon Khomeini," and "Our leader is Khomeini" as they marched to the front of the Fayzia school in Astana Square, where security forces attacked them in an attempt to disperse the gathering. However, when the gathering dispersed, it was suggested among the protesters that they proceed to Ayatollah Golpaygani's residence.

9 January 
The bazaar was closed in Qom on 9 January. On this day, according to the previous arrangements, the students gathered in front of the Khan school and Astana Square, from where they went to the house of religious leaders, like the previous day. When more people had gathered in Astana Square, in the afternoon, the crowd moved towards the house of Nouri, and gradually, due to the decrease in fear and panic, more people from different social classes joined the demonstration. Several thousand Khomeini followers protested on this day. At the Eram intersection and the museum's three-way intersection in Qom, the police and commandos were ready and waiting. Nouri addressed the audience and urged unity while defending Imam Khomeini and the student movement. Following the speech, the crowd once again began to march, but the police stopped them as they approached Safaieh Street. The demonstrations turned violent when someone, whether protester or provocateur, threw stones breaking the window of a nearby bank, which resulted in the security forces using live ammunition on the crowd.

Toll 
Between 5 and 300 of the demonstrating people were consequently killed by the Shah's security forces in the protest. According to Hossein Bashiriyeh, the peaceful demonstration by the religious students was cracked down on by police, leading to the death of 40–200 dead. A report by the CIA's National Foreign Assessment Center stated that the death toll was greater than the governmental reports.

Aftermath 
Religious and secular opposition organizations were galvanized into action against the Shah in response to the article and the violent persecution of Khomeini's supporters.  The high-ranking Qom scholars released a statement describing the Shah's government as "anti-Islamic and illegitimate" and announced "public mournings" for the dead. Consequently, news of the incident spread throughout Iran and quickly became an important landmark triggering a revolutionary mobilization. "The Society of Merchants and Guild of Tehran Bazaar, the Isfahani and Tabarizi bazaaris in Tehran, the National Front, the Toiler's party," and the left all expressed opposition to the regime's violent behavior. The Tehran Bazaar went on strike on January 12. On February 17 and 18, additional demonstrations and conflicts with police occurred. The most intense conflicts occurred in Tabriz on March 27 and 28 and May 7 and 8. In May, the scale of the demonstrations in Tehran prompted the government to deploy tanks on the streets. On August 10 and 11, similar events to those in Tabriz took place in Isfahan.

See also 

 1978 Tabriz protests

References

1978 in Iran
January 1978 events in Asia
Protests in Iran
Iranian Revolution
Ruhollah Khomeini